Fălești (Moldovan Cyrillic: Фэлешть) is a city and the administrative center of Fălești District, Moldova.

In January 2011, the population of Fălești was estimated to be 17,800.

History
The town had an important Jewish community before World War II, 51% of the total population. The Jews were murdered during the Holocaust.

Notable people
 Ion Păscăluță

Gallery

Further reading 
 Faleshty/Falesti (pp. 358–361) at Miriam Weiner's Routes to Roots Foundation

References

External links 
 

Cities and towns in Moldova
Beletsky Uyezd
Bălți County (Romania)
Holocaust locations in Moldova
Fălești District